NYRF can refer to:

New York Renaissance Faire
New York Radical Feminists